Nomwin is a large atoll, part of the Hall Islands, as well as a village and municipality (together with uninhabited East Fayu) in the state of Chuuk, Federated States of Micronesia.

It is located 9 km to the SW of Murilo Atoll and 82 km to the north of Chuuk Lagoon.
Together with Murilo it forms the Hall Islands.

References

Atolls of the Federated States of Micronesia
Municipalities of Chuuk State